Sinodytes hubbardi is a species of beetle in the family Dytiscidae, the only species in the genus Sinodytes.

References

Dytiscidae